Gowerton South railway station served the village of Gowerton, West Glamorgan, Wales from 1867 to 1964 on the Llanelly Railway.

History 
The station opened as Gower Road on 14 December 1867 by the Llanelly Railway. The name was changed to Gowerton South on 1 July 1886 to avoid confusion with another station in Gowerton. The station closed to both passengers and goods traffic on 15 June 1964.

References

External links 

Disused railway stations in Swansea
Former London and North Western Railway stations
Railway stations in Great Britain opened in 1866
Railway stations in Great Britain closed in 1964
1866 establishments in Wales
1964 disestablishments in Wales